Aftenbladet ("The Evening Paper") was a daily newspaper in Oslo, Norway.

History and profile
Aftenbladet was established in 1855 as a continuation of the satirical magazine Krydseren, and had the same editor-in-chief, Ditmar Meidell, for its entire existence except for a short time when J. F. Sandberg edited the newspaper. Contributors include Ole Richter, Bjørnstjerne Bjørnson, Frederik Bætzmann and Jens Braage Halvorsen. Bjørnson was political editor of the newspaper in 1859, published Ja, vi elsker for the first time in 1859 in Aftenbladet, and published En glad Gut as a feuilleton. The newspaper was liberal-leaning, and anti-Morgenbladet.

The newspaper was printed and published by Christian Schibsted until 1860 when it was sold to W. C. Fabritius. It became defunct in 1881.

References

1855 establishments in Norway
1881 disestablishments in Norway
Defunct newspapers published in Norway
Newspapers published in Oslo
Norwegian-language newspapers
Newspapers established in 1855
Publications disestablished in 1881
Daily newspapers published in Norway